Laird Macintosh (born June 27, 1962) is an American actor and comedian. He is best known as the host of the NBC reality television program Treasure Hunters.

Among his credits is the television series Hannah Montana, on which he portrayed a Secret Service agent. He also appeared in the episode "Charlie and Jordan Go to Prison" on the sitcom Anger Management.

Macintosh is a member of The Groundlings, a Los Angeles-based sketch and improv comedy troupe.

Laird's real surname is Rattray, as he uses his mother's maiden name. His younger sister, Heather Rattray, is also an actress.

He is not to be confused with stage actor Laird Mackintosh.

References

External links
 

1972 births
Living people
American male television actors
American game show hosts
Participants in American reality television series
Male actors from Evanston, Illinois